Ernst Ludvig Emanuel Schultz (15 May 1879 – 20 June 1906) was a Danish sprinter who won a bronze medal in the 400 m event at the 1900 Summer Olympics.

In the 1898-99 athletics season, Schultz had set Danish records in the 200 metres and quarter-mile distances and in 1899 he won the 150 metre national title when running for the Københavns IF club. The following year, just after his 21st birthday, he traveled to Paris, France to participate in the 1900 Summer Olympics, Schultz was the youngest of the 13 man team from Denmark. He competed in one event the 400 metres, in the first round, although his time is unknown, he finished in second place behind American William Moloney, so qualified for the final the next day. Schultz and five Americans had qualified for the final, but the final was run on a Sunday, and due to religious reason three Americans refused to run, so running a time of 51.5 seconds Schultz came last of the three finalist and won the bronze medal behind Maxie Long and Bill Holland. Later in the year with two other young men they founded Hellerup IK, which Schultz was chairman for the first year.

Besides athletics Schultz also competed in rowing and association football, then on 20 June 1906, just one month and five days after his 27th birthday he drowned while trying to rescue his rowing partner 20 year old footballer Thorald Petersen Høyen when their boat capsized in the Roskilde Fjord.

References

External links

Danish male sprinters
Athletes (track and field) at the 1900 Summer Olympics
Olympic bronze medalists for Denmark
Olympic athletes of Denmark
Deaths by drowning
1879 births
1906 deaths
Place of birth missing
People from Horsens
Accidental deaths in Denmark
Medalists at the 1900 Summer Olympics
Olympic bronze medalists in athletics (track and field)
Sportspeople from the Central Denmark Region